Keep Your Soul Together is an album recorded in 1973 by jazz trumpeter Freddie Hubbard. It was his fifth studio album released on Creed Taylor's CTI label, and features performances by Hubbard, Junior Cook, George Cables, Aurell Ray, Kent Brinkley, Ron Carter, Ralph Penland and Juno Lewis.

Track listing
 "Brigitte" - 9:10
 "Keep Your Soul Together" - 9:55
 "Spirits of Trane" - 9:10
 "Destiny's Children" - 10:20
 "Keep Your Soul Together" - 14:20 [CD bonus track]

All compositions by Freddie Hubbard.

Personnel
Freddie Hubbard - trumpet
Junior Cook - tenor saxophone
George Cables - electric piano
Aurell Ray - guitar
Kent Brinkley - bass
Ron Carter - electric bass
Ralph Penland - drums
Juno Lewis - percussion

References 

Freddie Hubbard albums
1974 albums
Albums produced by Creed Taylor
Albums recorded at Van Gelder Studio
CTI Records albums